Rajasthan is an Indian state. 

Rajasthan may also refer to:

Rajasthan (film), 1999 Indian Tamil-language film

See also
Rajputana 
Rajasthan Royals, Jaipur-based franchisee of the Indian Premier League